3rd Guards Brigade may refer to:

German
 3rd Guards Cavalry Brigade (German Empire)
 3rd Guards Artillery Brigade (German Empire)
 3rd Guards Infantry Brigade (German Empire)

Others
 3rd Guards Brigade (Croatia)
 3rd Guards Spetsnaz Brigade
 3rd Guards Brigade (United Kingdom)